Daet, officially the Municipality of Daet, is a 1st class municipality and capital of the province of Camarines Norte, Philippines. According to the 2020 census, it has a population of 111,700 people.

The municipality is a popular surfing spot among surfers worldwide. It is also home to the annual Daet International Aerosports Show which is first held in 2013.

Etymology
The name Daet was derived from the Bikol word dai-daitan which means, close to each other. Daet also originated from ancient Bicol term daet which, according to the first Bicol Spanish Dictionary Vocabulario de la Lengua Bicol authored by Fray Marcos de Lisboa, would mean "to make friend" or "to be reconciled".

History

Pre-colonial period

Daet was already an old community even before the discovery of the Philippines by Magellan in 1521. An ancient tomb unearthed in the Bicol region revealed references described in the Panayam manuscripts known to oriental history as corresponding to the first half of the thirteenth century. The early settlers were believed to be direct descendants of the group of datus who escaped from the court of Brunei to evade the enmity of a ruling rajah.

Spanish colonial period

In 1571, Juan de Salcedo arrived at the Bicol Region in quest for gold found in Camarines Norte and discovered that Daet was already a thriving settlement and noted that the houses were clustered together for reason of safety and protection. In June 1583, through a Franciscan Order confirmed the founding of Doctrinas including Daet.

Long after the implantation of the Spanish sovereignty, Don Juan de Salcedo, "talented, dashing grandson of Legazpi" found this community in the course of an expedition in search of gold which the Camarines mountains were heart to abound, marking the beginning of over a three-century Spanish regime patterned after the sword and the cross.

In the meantime, an incident happened in the court of Spain over the romances of a woman which pressed the King to exile a Spanish noble to the Philippines who eventually chose to come this way to spend the rest of his life, forget all, and start life anew. This noble was Don Manuel de la Estrada, Marquis de Camarines, who devoted a lifetime to help implement the Spanish colonization blueprint in the building of a new town over our old community. He supervised the construction of the church as it stands today, the old Spanish to exile a Spanish noble to the Philippines who eventually bridge (now covered by a Bailey bridge), other stone bridges buildings. He also brought the first abaca seedlings and encouraged its cultivation which has given the Philippines the world monopoly of hemp fiber. Incidentally, from the union of this noble to a Filipino woman followed a long line of blood relation which still link most of the old families of this community. The ruins of the palatial mansion of the Marquis de Camarines were still visible in recent years, on the spot where the new building of the Provincial Capitol now stands.

Except for recurring raids by the Moro pirates who occasionally came on their fast frail vintas to pillage this community causing the fortification of barrio Mercedes (now an independent municipality since 1948) during the Spanish regime, this community lived progressively in blissful peace and contentment. Formerly, the whole of the present Province of Camarines Norte was known as the District of Daet and this capital was a "Comandancia" of the original province of Camarines during the Spanish regime. In the few times that the Province of Camarines Norte was separated from and again fused with Camarines Sur from the Spanish to the American regimes, Daet always retained her importance as the provincial capital. In the ensuing changes, this municipality lost further much of her territory which was restored to Camarines Sur, and due to the segregation of the Municipality of Basud which was a former barrio of this community in the year 1908.

No less than thirteen martyrs were contributed by this community before the altar of liberty. They were butchered or burned alive and buried in a common grave during the Holy Week on Easter Sunday, April 1898. The local "insurrectus", however, made a remarkable feat in the last days of the Spanish regime when they succeeded in containing the Spanish local garrison and subjected them under relentless attack. The Spaniards were dramatically saved from annihilation by burning at the timely arrival of their rescue ship. Daet today takes a distinct pride for owning the first monument ever erected in the Philippines in honor of the foremost Filipino hero and martyr, Dr. Jose P. Rizal Protacio y Mercado, at the inspiration of Don Antonio Sans, Commanding Officer of the Philippine Revolutionary Forces in the sector.

American colonial period
The Philippine–American War was felt very little in this town. The American forces came unopposed on March 4, 1900, when almost the rest of the Bicol Region was subdued by Major McNamee under the overall command of General Bates before whom Commander Antonio Sans previously arranged in Camarines Sur the terms of surrender which were acceptable to the American Command. The strides undergone by this community under the American regime is yet to be written in bold letters of gold, a period which brought about the present day progress of this generation.

Martial law 

On the evening of September 23, 1972, President Ferdinand Marcos announced on television that he had placed the Philippienes, including Daet, under martial law.  The marked the beginning of a 14-year period of one-man rule. Even though Martial Law was formally lifted on January 17, 1981, Marcos retained essentially all of his powers as dictator until he was deposed by the February 1986 People Power revolution.

On June 14, 1982 Marcos administration forces opened fire on protesters from different barrios, who were marching to demand an increase in copra prices, and to denounce "fake elections" and Cocofed. The government forces who fired on the protesters were led by a certain Capt. Malilay."   Four people died on the spot, and at least 50 were injured. Two of those who were seriously wounded died two months later.  This has come to be known as the "1981 Daet massacre," and four of those killed have since been honored by having their names engraved on the Wall of Remembrance at the Bantayog ng mga Bayani memorial.

Conversion to cityhood

A P30-million government center, a P30-million transport terminal and an improved airport are among the large-scale face-lift projects that Camarines Norte's capital town plans to embark on as it aggressively vies for cityhood.

The projects, including a new face of the town plaza, were presented by Mayor Tito Sarion in an executive report last month. "The enhancement of the elevated plaza is necessary to decongest the downtown in an attempt to rebuild the center of the commercial district," he said.

Sarion said the United Architects of the Philippines had agreed to design the new plaza through a P3-million grant provided by the party-list group Bayan Muna.

The funds for the government center and transport facility will be borrowed from the Land Bank of the Philippines, while the revitalized Bagasbas airport project will be funded by the Air Transportation Office (ATO).

Sarion said the proposed government center would make transactions with provincial and national government agencies more convenient while the new legislative hall would "create a breathing space and a better working environment at the municipal hall, where offices are crowded."

Geography

Barangays
Daet is politically subdivided into 25 barangays.

 Alawihao
 Awitan
 Bagasbas
 Barangay I (Ilaod)
 Brgy II (Pasig)
 Brgy III (Iraya)
 Brgy IV (Mantagbac)
 Brgy V (Pandan)
 Brgy VI (Centro)
 Brgy VII (Diego Liñan)
 Brgy VIII (Salcedo)
 Bibirao
 Borabod
 Calasgasan
 Camambugan
 Cobangbang
 Dogongan
 Gahonon
 Gubat (3 Districts – Moreno, Gubat, & Mandulongan)
 Lag-on
 Magang
 Mambalite
 Pamorangon
 Mancruz
 San Isidro

Climate

Demographics

Economy 

The municipality is rich in mineral resources such as diatomaceous earth (DE) or commonly called white clay. This is one of the income generating industries of the municipality. This non-metallic mineral has a total approximate reserve of 1,289,600 metric tons.

The municipality also has a viable source of sand and gravel. It is being extracted by mining concessionaires.

Central Business Districts 
Emulating the city planning and zone development of Naga City as one of its primary market catchment, the local government of Daet intends to maintain its central area for commercial activities and public events in the convergence of its primary roads where the boundaries of Barangay 5, Barangay 6, Barangay 4, and Barangay 8 meet.

Another central business district in development is located along the four-lane national road in barangay Lag-on where SM City Daet is situated in front of the central bus terminal near a local college foundation and a road going to the Cathedral of Daet.

Infrastructure

Land transportation is the primary means of transporting people, goods and services from the barangay to the town proper of Daet. The town is being linked to its different barangays by the municipality's major roads, namely the Maharlika Highway. It has a total length of 25.50 kilometers stretching from the boundary of the municipality of Daet to the Camarines Norte – Camarines Sur boundary. The Mangcamagong provincial road has a total length of 9.46 kilometers, stretching from the municipal boundary of Basud and Mercedes to the junction of Maharlika highway.

 Water supply: The barangays of the municipality is being served by levels I, II and III water supply. To cope with the consumption demand especially during summer, the CNWD has constructed an elevated water tank with a capacity of 200 cubic meters and implementing the "Tubig ng Buhay, Hatid sa Barangay" program. Some barangays are being served by shallow wells, deep wells or dug wells.

 Power supply: Daet is being served by electric power, formerly by the defunct Hidalgo Electric Enterprise, now by the National Power Corporation through the Camarines Norte Electric Cooperative (CANORECO). After the establishment of this cooperative, there was a great improvement in terms of power supply condition in the municipality.

 Communication: Daet has a telecommunication system that is being run by one personnel of the Department of Transportation (DOTr). There are three satellites of Smart, Globe and Dito. There is postal office and has a staff of one mail carriers serving all barangays in the municipality. These personnel cannot adequately serve the entire from the lack of personnel; another problem is the difficulty in the delivery of mails in the remote and far-flung barangays.

Tourism

Surfing and beaches
Daet is a famous surfing and kiteboarding spot, as it has a long stretch of beach in Bagasbas. Because of the attention it has gotten from the local surfing community, the Philippine Department of Tourism turned it into a local accredited surfing spot.

Aside from being a spot for surfing and kiteboarding, the Calaguas group of islands, in the jurisdiction of Vinzons, to its north has garnered attention from local and foreign tourists alike. The islands can be considered virgin as no resorts have been created there yet.

Places of interest

 University of Camarines Norte
 Cory Aquino Boulevard, the longest boulevard in the Philippines.
 SM City Daet (located in Lag-on) - The 3rd SM mall in Bicol region and 77th mall of SM Supermalls in the Philippines

Churches
 Most Holy Trinity Cathedral, it was built and was inaugurated in 1984.  It is also the cathedral of the Diocese of Daet
 Parroquia de San Juan Bautista, established in 1611, it is one of the first church in Camarines Norte in the region built by the Franciscan Friars.
 Saint Joseph, Husband of Mary Parish, in Lag-on
 Our Lady Of Peñafrancia Parish in Moreno Dist., Gubat
 Divine Mercy Parish in Alawihao

Historical landmarks

 1st Rizal Monument - The first monument in honor of a Filipino hero, Dr. José Rizal. Its foundation was made of mortars and boulders from the demolished old Spanish jail in Daet. Lt. Col. Antonio Sanz and Lt. Col. Ildefonso Alegre of Philippine Revolutionary Army initiated the construction of the monument which was unveiled on December 20, 1898.
 Provincial Capitol
 Old Daet Municipal Building
 Daet Elevated Town Plaza
 Daet Municipal Building
 Pineapple Fountain
 President Cory Aquino Boulevard (Bagasbas Boulevard)
 Daet Airport — located near the beach at barangay Bagasbas

Festivals
The Pineapple Festival (or "Pinyasan" as it is called by the locals) is considered to be the most colorful festivals in Camarines Norte. The festival started in 1992, and is about the province's prime agricultural product, which is the "Queen of All Pineapple" pineapple. Noted for its sweetness and flavor, this kind of pineapple is produced only in Camarines Norte, thereby making it a specialty in the province. The festival goes on for about 10 days, and several events are held in the municipality. The festival aims to promote the culture of Daet and its citizens. The Pineapple Festival is held every June 22–26 annually initiated by Mayor Tito Sarte Sarion.

The Bantayog Festival celebrates the founding of Camarines Norte. As of 2009, it has been 89 years since the province has become independent, since March 3, 1975, when Ambos Camarines (At that time Camarines Norte and Camarines Sur were one province) was split from two. This festival promotes the province as one which has unnoticed potential in the fields of tourism and commerce, and also the rich culture and hospitality of the people of Camarines Norte. The Bantayog Festival is held every March or April annually. It was launched in April 1982.

Notable people

 Manuel Conde, National Artist of the Philippines for Film (2009)
 Ricky Lee, National Artist of the Philippines for Film and Broadcast Arts (2022)
 Robin Padilla, Actor
 Ambet Nabus, Radio Anchor, Comedian and Show Business Reporter
 Fortunato "Atoy" Co, Former PBA Player, Actor, Politician
 Joross Gamboa, TV Actor
 Precious Paula Nicole, Drag Performer, Winner of Drag Race Philippines Season 1
 Sydney Joseph L. Torronueva, Top 3 Ten Outstanding Students of the Philippines 2022.

References

External links 

Municipality of Daet
 [ Philippine Standard Geographic Code]
Philippine Census Information

Municipalities of Camarines Norte
Provincial capitals of the Philippines
Surfing locations in the Philippines